Menomonie can refer to:

United States
 Menomonie, Wisconsin
 Menomonie (town), Wisconsin
 Menomonie High School
 Menomonie Municipal Airport
 Menomonie Blue Devils, a nickname for the sports teams of University of Wisconsin–Stout

See also
 Menominee (disambiguation)
 Menomonee (disambiguation)